William Rich Cornish (March 2, 1890 – December 29, 1969) was a provincial politician from Alberta, Canada. He served as a member of the Legislative Assembly of Alberta from 1944 to 1955, sitting with the Social Credit caucus in government.

References

Alberta Social Credit Party MLAs
1969 deaths
1890 births